Wadersloh is a municipality in the district of Warendorf, in North Rhine-Westphalia, Germany. It is situated approximately 10 km north-west of Lippstadt and 30 km east of Hamm. In it there is a grammar school which is named Gymnasium Johanneum. Wadersloh was the place of a bike race in 2008 with competitors from all over the world.

Mayors
Christian Thegelkamp was elected mayor in 2009 and reelected in 2014 and 2020.

References